Lai'an County is a county in the east of Anhui Province, China, lying between the Yangtze River and the Huai River. It is under the administration of Chuzhou city.

Administrative divisions
Lai'an County has 8 towns and 4 townships.
8 Towns

4 Townships

Climate

Chuzhou